Protein salvador homolog 1 is a protein that in humans is encoded by the SAV1 gene.

WW domain-containing proteins are found in all eukaryotes and play an important role in the regulation of a wide variety of cellular functions such as protein degradation, transcription, and RNA splicing. This gene encodes a protein which contains 2 WW domains and a coiled-coil region. It is ubiquitously expressed in adult tissues. The encoded protein is 94% identical to the mouse protein at the amino acid level.

References

Further reading